Monty Powell (born June 1, 1961) is an American country music songwriter best known for collaborating with Keith Urban, and for producing albums by Diamond Rio.

Powell's first songwriting credit was a jingle for an Allstate commercial. After moving to Nashville, Tennessee in the early 1990s, Powell wrote several songs for Diamond Rio, whose lead singer Marty Roe was a roommate of his while they were in college at Lipscomb University. Other artists who recorded Powell's songs include Tracy Byrd, Chris Cagle, Billy Ray Cyrus, Tim McGraw, Collin Raye, and Restless Heart. One of his first collaborations with Urban was his debut single, "It's a Love Thing", which reached Top 20 in 1999.

Powell won awards for Song, Songwriter, and Publisher of the Year in 2009 from SESAC. He also received a Country Music Association nomination in 2006 for co-writing Urban's "Tonight I Wanna Cry", and an Album of the Year award in 1994 for collaborating on Common Thread: The Songs of the Eagles.

Powell is the father of Suzannah Powell, who is known as the experimental rap artist Boyfriend.

Currently, alongside his wife Anna Wilson, Powell spends his time co-writing, producing and performing in a new band they have founded together called Troubadour 77, that pays homage to the 70s Laurel Canyon SoCal sound.

Songwriting

Selma Avenue / Troubadour 77
Drive / Troubadour 77
Steal Forever / Troubadour 77
When We’re Gone / Troubadour 77
For You / Keith Urban
Miss Me Baby / Chris Cagle
Days Go By / Be Here / Keith Urban
Tonight I Want To Cry / Be Here/ Keith Urban
She's Gotta Be / Keith Urban
These Are The Days / Keith Urban
Who Wouldn't Want To Be Me / Keith Urban
It's A Love Thing / Keith Urban
What A Beautiful Day / Chris Cagle
I Love It When She Does That / Chris Cagle
Night On The Country / Chris Cagle
It Takes Two / Chris Cagle
Growin’ Love / Chris Cagle
Just Love Me / Chris Cagle
Look At What I’ve Done / Chris Cagle
Luckiest Man In The World / Neil McCoy
I Am That Man / Brooks & Dunn
When You Gonna Run To Me / Lee Ann Womack
New York City Subway Rider / Anna Wilson
It's Got Me / Anna Wilson
Always The Same / Anna Wilson
Could Have Been Me / Billy Ray Cyrus
Words By Heart / Billy Ray Cyrus
Let Me Be Wrong Again / Sons of the Desert
Damn the Whiskey / Brad Martin
Why Not Colorado / McBride &The Ride
If A Man Ain’t Thinkin / Jerry Kilgore
Radio Romance / Canyon
Dancy’ Dream / Restless Heart
Norma Jean Riley / Diamond Rio
Nowhere Bound / Diamond Rio
Finished What We Started / Diamond Rio
They Don't Make Hearts Like They Used To / Diamond Rio
The Ballad of Conley & Billy / Diamond Rio
Pick Me Up / Diamond Rio
Calling All Hearts / Diamond Rio
Down By The Riverside / Diamond Rio
I Was Meant To Be With You / Diamond Rio
Kentucky Mine / Diamond Rio
Old Weakness / Diamond Rio (
I'll Go Down Loving You / Shenandoah
The Love That We Lost / Chely Wright
Cowboy Band / Billy Dean
This Is Me Missing You / James House
One Of These Days / Tim McGraw
Pete's Music City / Alabama
Straight and Narrow / Barbra Mandrell
Straight and Narrow / Wild Rose
My Kind of Girl / Collin Raye
Love Lessons / Track Byrd
The Chain Just Broke / Paulette Carlson
Love Won / Ray Kennedy
Easy Goin’ / Ray Kennedy
Between a Rock and a Heartache / David Slater
One of These Days / Marcus Hummon
Straight As The Crow Flies / Marcus Hummon
I Do / Marcus Hummon
Brand New Me / Chad Brock
That's Another Song / Bryan White
Tender Moment / Oak Ridge Boys
That Wasn't Me / Davis Daniel
Someone Else's Tears / James Prosser
Portrait Of An American Family / Dusty Drake
I'm Not Afraid / Michelle Wright
My Last Word / Kathy Mattea
I Didn't Think It Would Hurt / Amanda Norman Sell
Ten Paces, Turn Around / The Ministers
Perpetual Emotion / The Ministers
Crying In Paradise / The Ministers
To Whom It May Concern / The Ministers
With or Without Me / Jeff Wood
He Said, She Said / Richie Havens/Anton Figg
I'm Ready When You Are / Robert Ellis Orral
Courage of Daniel / Wade Kimes
Don't Let Go Of My Heart / Phil Keaggy
Friday Night / Western Flyer
Pieces/Rascal Flatts/ “Me and My Gang’
Shine / Keith Urban / “Love
Tu Compania / Keith Urban/
Raise The Barn /  Keith Urban
You Don't Act Like My Woman / James Otto
Damn Right / James Otto
Sunset Man  / James Otto
All I Ever Wanted / Chuck Wicks
Good Time Coming On / Chuck Wicks
I'm Done / Jo Dee Messina
Sweet Thing / Keith Urban
Kiss A Girl /Keith Urban
Till Summer Comes Around / Keith Urban
She Goes All The Way / Rascal Flatts & Jamie Foxx
As You Turn Away/Lady Antebellum
If I Knew Then / Lady Antebellum
Stars Tonight / Lady Antebellum
When the Party's Over / Trent Tomlinson
Hey Love / Better Than Ezra
Fancy Things / Royal Bliss
Into The Night / Royal Bliss
Baby Just Hold On / Royal Bliss
I Will Never Know/ Anna Wilson
Faces of Love / Jeanette McCurdy
Angels / Austin's Bridge
Times Like These / Austin's Bridge

References

American country songwriters
American male songwriters
American country record producers
People from Gordon County, Georgia
Living people
1961 births
Songwriters from Georgia (U.S. state)
Calhoun High School alumni